Dalia (Arabic :داليا) is an Egyptian singer born in Al Mansoura, Egypt.

After being discovered by Egyptian songwriter Jamal Salameh, she sang as guest on several songs on Hameed Al-Shaeri's 1994 album, Hodoa Moaqat, which helped launch her solo career.

Singles with Al-Shaeri, Ehab Tawfeeq, and Kuwaiti actor and singer Ahmad Johar followed. Dalia sang in the Egyptian musical El-Qods Ha Tergaa Lena. Her first album in 1998 was well received, but a second album in 1999 failed to mark the move to a solo career.

Discography
Albums:
 Bahebak enta 1998 ( بحبك انت )
 Mograma 1999 (مغرمة)

References

External links
 Bahebak enta (album cover)

Living people
20th-century Egyptian women singers
Year of birth missing (living people)